Rising Moon is a 2005 Nigerian drama film directed by Andy Nwakalor and starring Onyeka Onwenu. The film received 12 nominations and won 6 awards at the African Movie Academy Awards in 2006, including the awards for Best Picture, Best Visual Effect and Best Editing.

Cast
Onyeka Onwenu
 Justus Esiri
 Akume Akume
 Arthur Brooks
 Maureen Solomon

See also
 List of Nigerian films of 2005

References

Arthur Brooks is a media educationist, Nigerian film producer, actor currently living in Nigeria

External links
 

2005 films
Nigerian drama films
English-language Nigerian films
2005 drama films
Best Film Africa Movie Academy Award winners
Best Editing Africa Movie Academy Award winners
2000s English-language films